"Holiday" is a protest song by American rock band Green Day. It was released as the third single from the group's seventh studio album American Idiot, and is also the third track. The song is in the key of F minor. Though the song is a prelude to "Boulevard of Broken Dreams", "Holiday" was released as a single later on, on March 14, 2005.

The song achieved considerable popularity across the world and performed moderately well on the charts. In the US, it reached number 19 on the US Billboard Hot 100 and number one on the Hot Modern Rock Tracks and Hot Mainstream Rock Tracks charts. It debuted at number 11 in the United Kingdom and reached the top 20 in Canada, Denmark, Ireland, New Zealand, and Norway.

Background
One of two explicitly political songs on the album (the other being fellow single "American Idiot"), "Holiday" took two months to finish writing, because Armstrong continually felt his lyrics were not good enough. Aided by the encouragement of Cavallo, he completed the song. "Holiday" was inspired by the music of Bob Dylan. Armstrong wanted to write something stronger than "American Idiot", with harsh language to illustrate his points. The song takes aim at American conservatism. Armstrong felt that Republican politicians were "strategic" in alienating one group of people—for example, the gay community—in order to buy the votes of another. He later characterized the song as an outspoken "fuck you" to then-President George W. Bush. Armstrong for the first time imagined how he would perform the songs he was writing, and envisioned an audience responding to his lyric "Can I get another Amen?" The song's bridge, which Armstrong hoped to be as "twisted as possible," was designed as a "politician's worst nightmare."

The chorus's refrain—"This is our lives on holiday"—was intended to reflect the average American's apathy on the issues of the day. Armstrong characterized the song as "not anti-American, it’s anti-war."

Live performances
In live performances, video screens would display footage of helicopters dropping bombs. In New Jersey, at the Revolution Radio Tour, the lyrics "Pulverize the Eiffel Towers" were changed to "Pulverize the Donald Trump Towers".

Depending on the location of the performance, the lyric "the representative from California now has the floor" will be changed to reference the country or state where the song is being performed (e.g. "the representative from United Kingdom now has the floor").

Music video
The first half of the video takes place in a car (a 1968 Mercury Monterey convertible), where Billie Joe Armstrong, Mike Dirnt and Tré Cool are partying around in Las Vegas. In the second half, they are cavorting in a bar where each of the band members portrays several different characters. Billie Joe Armstrong plays the mentioned Representative of California, two fighting clients, a punk rocker and a nerd. Tré Cool plays a drunken priest, an arrested patron, and a female prostitute. Mike Dirnt plays the barman, another punk, and a policeman. There are also scenes featuring seemingly worn-down can-can dancers. At the end of the video, the car smokes to a halt in the field that "Boulevard of Broken Dreams" begins in. Like the video for "Boulevard of Broken Dreams", this video was directed by Samuel Bayer.

The band arrived at the 2005 MTV Video Music Awards in the same car, this time "pimped out" by James Washburn, a friend of the band.

Track listings

UK 7-inch picture disc

 Live tracks were recorded on September 21, 2004, at the Irving Plaza in New York City.

Personnel
Credits are adapted from the UK-European CD1 liner notes.
 Green Day – music, production
 Billie Joe Armstrong – words, lead vocals, guitar
 Mike Dirnt – bass guitar, backing vocals
 Tré Cool – drums
 Rob Cavallo – production
 Doug McKean – engineering
 Chris Lord-Alge – mixing
 Pat Magnarella, Mosaic Media Group – management
 Chris Bilheimer – art direction
 Marina Chavez – band photo

Charts and certifications

Weekly charts

Year-end charts

Certifications

Release history

Notable covers

The song was first covered by the Irish pop punk band Scuba Dice in 2006 and charted at number eight on the Irish Singles Chart, number two on the download chart that week, and went on to be the 42nd-best-selling single of 2008 by an Irish artist.

Hayseed Dixie also performed a bluegrass cover of the song on the band's album A Hot Piece of Grass.

The song "Dr. Who on Holiday", from the mash-up album American Edit, combines "Holiday", The KLF single "Doctorin' the Tardis", and the original theme from the television show Doctor Who, while the intro juxtaposes George W. Bush with the Daleks, a race of monsters from the aforementioned British television series.

In popular culture
"Holiday" was used as the goal song of the Vancouver Canucks during their run to the 2011 Stanley Cup Finals; the Canucks also reused it for Henrik Sedin's personal goal song in 2016–17 and for the team as a whole during the 2018–19 NHL season. The song was also included on the soundtrack of the video game Tony Hawk's American Wasteland.

See also
 List of anti-war songs

References

 

2004 songs
2005 singles
American Idiot
Anti-war songs
Green Day songs
LGBT-related songs
Music videos directed by Samuel Bayer
Reprise Records singles
Song recordings produced by Rob Cavallo
Songs about George W. Bush
Songs written by Billie Joe Armstrong
Songs written by Mike Dirnt
Songs written by Tré Cool
Warner Music Group singles
Cultural depictions of George W. Bush
Songs of the Iraq War